Durbeen (The Prevision) is a 2009 Bangladeshi film directed by Zafor Firoze. It is the first digital children film released in Bangladesh.

Plot

Labib a school boy is a believer of equality. He loves all the living beings. Labib's mother died years ago. He has school friends. Although he is a good student, he couldn't concentrate on study because of his missing mother. One day he gets a new class teacher in school. The teacher inspires him to learn through interesting teaching process. They become good friends. Labib's father makes a sudden decision to send him abroad for better education, but Labibe can not accept it as this would imply leaving his friends and his new teacher. Labib becomes physically and mentally sick. After some days his father changes his mind, allowing Labib to stay.

Release

The film was released on 29 October 2009. Many notable persons attended the premier show at Star Cineplex. Barrister Shafique Ahmed, Minister for Law, Justice and Parliament; Abul Kalam Azad, Minister for Information and Culture; Sharmin Chowdhury, State Minister for Women and Children; Artist Mustafa Manwar, Chairman of Bangladesh Shishu Academy; Mohammad Asafuddoula, Chairman of the Advisory Committee of Bangladesh Digital Film Society; Sultan Mahmud, Country Director of Save the Children Australia; Film star Ilias Kanchan were among them. Many children organisations including UNICEF, Save the Children praised Durbeen as a successful film. The film was shown in many district towns in Bangladesh.

References

 Film Durbeen; The Daily Ittefaq 
 
 
 
 
 

2009 films
2009 drama films
Bengali-language Bangladeshi films
Bangladeshi drama films
2000s Bengali-language films